Incorporated in May 1997, Cool Mountain Beverages, Inc. (CMB) manufactures a line of gourmet sodas. The company is based in Des Plaines, Il. with franchise operations (through Dr. Pepper Bottling) in West Jefferson, North Carolina and Real Soda Ltd in Gardena, California. Cool Mountain Beverage products are licensed and distributed through franchisees throughout the U.S. The company's bag n box operations are based in Chicago, Illinois.

All Cool Mountain sodas are caffeine-free and manufactured with pure cane sugar.

When the company started, the soda label depicted an illustration of Native American Chief Hollow Horn Bear, a rendering inspired by a 14 cent stamp. In 2007, the label was changed to a rendering of Mount Rainier.

Flavors 

 Blue Razzberry 
 Green Apple
 Strawberry
 Black Cherry
 Cream Soda
 Root Beer
 Orange Cream
 Peach

The company is set to introduce flavored lemonades, mixers and spring water in 2013.

References

External links 
 Cool Mountain website
 BevNet

American soft drink brands
Carbonated drinks